The 1973 election for Mayor of Los Angeles took place on April 3, 1973, with a run-off election on May 29, 1973. Incumbent Sam Yorty was defeated by councilman Tom Bradley in a rematch of the 1969 mayoral election. 

Yorty's growing apathy towards the office of Mayor and his previous tactics against Bradley would be the main points of criticisms towards him, and coupled with Bradley's popularity would lead to his defeat. The election would make Bradley the first African-American mayor of Los Angeles.

Municipal elections in California, including Mayor of Los Angeles, are officially nonpartisan; candidates' party affiliations do not appear on the ballot.

Election 
Although Yorty was re-elected in 1969, he started to show boredom in his position as Mayor as he had travelled out of the city for most of his tenure. He ran for governor in 1970 and lost to Speaker of the California State Assembly Jesse M. Unruh, later running for the Democratic nomination for President in 1972 before ending his bid before the California primary. Yorty then announced that he was running for Mayor, seeking an unprecedented fourth term in office. 

He was again challenged by Councilman Tom Bradley, making his second run for the office, as well as Unruh, LAPD Chief Thomas Reddin, councilmember Joel Wachs, and actor Bob Dornan. Polls frequently had Bradley having a substantial lead over Yorty and the other candidates, although some speculated that Unruh or Reddin could advance to the primary with Bradley instead of Yorty. In the primary, Bradley and Yorty advanced to the runoff election again, setting the stage for a rematch of the 1969 mayoral election.

In the ensuing campaign, Bradley criticized Yorty for visiting convicted income tax evader Josn Alessio alongside Phil Regan, who would later be convicted of bribery; Yorty attacked Bradley for allegedly "accepting loans tied to gambling interests." Polls showed Bradley leading Yorty in the race, although Yorty discounted the polls as he had won the previous election with polls showing the same thing. This time, however, Bradley defeated Yorty to become Mayor, ending Yorty's tenure of 12 years. After his loss, Yorty changed his party affiliation from Democrat to Republican in September 1973.

Results

Primary election

General election

References and footnotes

External links
 Office of the City Clerk, City of Los Angeles

1973
Los Angeles
Los Angeles mayoral election
Mayoral election
Los Angeles mayoral election
Los Angeles mayoral election